Joachim Frederick 'Joggie' Viljoen  (born 14 May 1945) is a former South African rugby union player.

Playing career
He played six test matches for the Springboks and made his debut against the touring French team on 12 June 1971 at the Free State Stadium in Bloemfontein. He also played in all three test matches against Australia during the South African tour of Australia in 1971. His last test was against England at Ellis Park in 1972. Viljoen scored two tries in his six test matches and another two tries in four tour matches.

Test history

See also
List of South Africa national rugby union players – Springbok no. 448

References

1945 births
Living people
South African rugby union players
South Africa international rugby union players
Rugby union players from Cape Town
Rugby union scrum-halves
Griquas (rugby union) players
Eastern Province Elephants players